Mario Cevasco (18 December 1938 – 12 April 1999) was an Italian water polo player. He competed at the 1964, 1968 and 1972 Olympics and finished in fourth, fourth and sixth place, contributing three, seven and one goals, respectively.

Cevasco started playing water polo in the 1950s, but missed the 1960 Olympics because of his studies. He won 12 national titles and one international medal, a bronze at the 1963 Mediterranean Games. He died of cancer, aged 60, and was survived by wife Laura, children Nicola and Elisa, and brother Angelo.

References

1938 births
1999 deaths
Olympic water polo players of Italy
Water polo players at the 1964 Summer Olympics
Water polo players at the 1968 Summer Olympics
Water polo players at the 1972 Summer Olympics
Italian male water polo players
Mediterranean Games bronze medalists for Italy
Competitors at the 1963 Mediterranean Games
Mediterranean Games medalists in water polo
Sportspeople from the Province of Genoa
20th-century Italian people